Grand-Santi Airport  is an airport serving the Lawa River port of Grand-Santi, a commune of French Guiana.

Airlines and destinations

Statistics

See also

List of airports in French Guiana
Transport in French Guiana

References

External links
OpenStreetMap - Grand-Santi
OurAirports - Grand-Santi Airport
GCM - Grand-Santi

Airports in French Guiana
Buildings and structures in Grand-Santi